This is a list of definitions of commonly used terms of location and direction in dentistry. This set of terms provides orientation within the oral cavity, much as anatomical terms of location provide orientation throughout the body.

Terms

Combining of terms

Most of the principal terms can be combined using their corresponding combining forms (such as mesio- for mesial and disto- for distal). They provide names for directions (vectors) and axes; for example, the coronoapical axis is the long axis of a tooth. Such combining yields terms such as those in the following list. The abbreviations should be used only in restricted contexts, where they are explicitly defined and help avoid extensive repetition (for example, a journal article that uses the term "mesiodistal" dozens of times might use the abbreviation "MD"). The abbreviations are ambiguous: (1) they are not specific to these terms; (2) they are not even one-to-one specific within this list; and (3) some of the combined terms are little used, and the abbreviations of the latter are even less used. Therefore, spelling out is best.

The combined terms include apicocoronal (AC), buccoapical (BA), buccocervical (BC), buccogingival (BG), buccolabial (BL), buccolingual (BL), bucco-occlusal (BO), buccopalatal (BP), coronoapical (CA), distoapical (DA), distobuccal (DB), distocervical (DC), distocoronal (DC), distogingival (DG), distolingual (DL), disto-occlusal or distoclusal (DO), distopalatal (DP), linguobuccal (LB), linguo-occlusal (LO), mesioapical (MA), mesiobuccal (MB), mesiocervical (MC), mesiocoronal (MC), mesiodistal (MD), mesiogingival (MG), mesio-occlusal or mesioclusal (MO), mesiopalatal (MP).

See also 

 Anatomical terms of location

References

External links
 Glossary of dental terms on Wiktionary

Dentistry
Wikipedia glossaries using description lists